Morganville is the name of several places in North America:

 Canada
 Morganville, Nova Scotia
 United States of America
 Morganville, Georgia
 Morganville, Kansas
 Morganville, New Jersey
 Morganville, New York
 Morganville, Ohio
 Morganville, Washington

Morganville is also the name of some fictional places:

 Morganville, earlier name for Shelbyville on The Simpsons
 Morganville, Texas, setting for the Morganville Vampires novels by Rachel Caine

See also
Morgansville, West Virginia